The Triathlon at the 2005 Southeast Asian Games was held at the Boardwalk, Subic Bay Freeport Zone, Zambales, Philippines on December 1 and 2. The participants are competing for individual gold medals in the men's and women's events.

The SEA Games distances for the three disciplines are:
Swimming - 1500 m
Road cycling - 40 km
Road running - 10 km

The events will run in sequence, so that the person who crossed the line in first place at the end of the run is declared the winner.

Medalists

Results

Women's triathlon (December 1, 2005)

Men's triathlon (December 2, 2005)

External links
Southeast Asian Games Official Results

Triathlon
Southeast Asian Games
2005